Napier Bay is an Arctic waterway in Qikiqtaaluk Region, Nunavut, Canada. It is located in Norwegian Bay off Devon Island's Grinnell Peninsula. To the west lies Crescent Island.

Bays of Qikiqtaaluk Region